The Third Baptist Church, formerly the First Colored Baptist Church, is an African American Baptist church founded in 1852, and located in the Western Addition neighborhood of San Francisco, California. It is the city of San Francisco's oldest African-American church. The church occupied several spaces in San Francisco over the course of its history. Since 1976, Rev. Amos C. Brown has been the pastor. 

The Third Baptist Church Complex is listed as a San Francisco Designated Landmark since November 15, 2017.

History 
In August 1852, the First Colored Baptist Church congregation was founded in the house of Eliza and William Davis, by Black parishioners including the Davis family, Abraham Brown, Thomas Bundy, Harry Fields, Thomas Davenport, Willie Denton, George Lewis, and Fielding Spotts. Prior to 1852, African American Baptist parishioners attended the primarily-white First Baptist Church, and were forced to sit in the balcony. Other African American churches founded in 1852 in San Francisco included Bethel African Methodist Episcopal Church (Bethel AME Church), and African Methodist Episcopal Zion Church (AME Zion Church).  

The first location of the church building was founded in 1852 at the corner Grant Avenue and Greenwich Street in San Francisco. The former Grant Avenue location is listed as a California Historical Landmark (Number 1010) since February 16, 1993.  

In 1854, the church was moved to Dupont Street at Greenwich Street, the location was the former First Baptist Church. A year later in 1855, the church was renamed as the Third Baptist Church but the name did not legally changed until 1908. 

The church building at 1399 McAllister Street was designed by architect William F. Gunnison and completed in 1952. In 1958, W. E. B. Du Bois spoke to the church congregation.

Pastors 

 Rev. Charles Satchell, 1857 to 1858;
 Rev. J. H. Kelley, March 14, 1869 to ?;
 Rev. Frederick Douglas Haynes Sr., August 29, 1932 to 1971;
 Rev. Frederick Douglas Haynes Jr., June 25, 1972 to September 3, 1975;
 Rev. Amos C. Brown, September 19, 1976 to present

See also 
 African Americans in California
 Black church
 List of San Francisco Designated Landmarks
 Racial segregation of churches in the United States

References

External links 
 Official website

1852 establishments in California
California Historical Landmarks
San Francisco Designated Landmarks
African-American churches
Churches in San Francisco
African-American history in San Francisco